The General Congress of Bukovina was a self-proclaimed representative body created in the aftermath of the Romanian military intervention in Bukovina, which proclaimed the union of the region with the Kingdom of Romania in 1918.

On 28 November 1918, the Congress elected Iancu Flondor as chairman, and voted for the union with the Kingdom of Romania, with the full support of the Romanian, German, and Polish representatives; the Ukrainians did not want to participate.

There were six Polish representatives: Bazyl Duzinkiewicz, Emil Kaminski, Stanisław (Stanislaus) Kwiatkowski, Wladislaw Pospiszil, Leopold Szweiger, and Edmund Wicentowicz. Among the Romanian representatives there were Iancu Flondor, Vladimir de Repta, Dionisie Bejan, Ion Nistor, Octavian Gheorghian, Radu Sbiera, Vasile Bodnarescu, Gheorghe Şandru, Vasile Marcu, Dimitrie Bucevschi, Gheorghe Voicu, Vasile Alboi-Şandru, Ion Candrea, and Eudoxiu Hurmuzachi. The German representatives were: Rudolf Gaisdorf, Viktor Glondys, Adam Hodel, Rafael Kaindl, Edwin Landwehr de Pragenau, Alois Lebouton, and Emil Wellisch.

The Congress unanimously passed a motion which mentioned:

On 28 November 1918, the General Congress of Bukovina cabled to the ministers of the Entente Powers, informing London, Washington, Paris, and Rome about the union with Romania.

See also
 Union of Bukovina with Romania

References

History of Bukovina
Greater Romania
Great Union (Romania)
1918 in Europe